Bâcu may refer to several villages in Romania:

 Bâcu, a village in Joița Commune, Giurgiu County
 Bâcu, a village in Ipatele Commune, Iaşi County
 Marian Bâcu, Romanian former footballer